Maxim Viktorovich Beitan (Latvian:Maksims Beitāns) (Russian: Максим Викторович Бейтан) (born 25 November 1986) known as Max Beitan, is a Latvian cellist. He is the winner of 18 international competitions five of them Grand Prix Awards. Max Beitan tours and performs extensively in Europe, the US and Asia and is famous by his virtuosic repertoire. Beitan currently resides in Lugano, Switzerland.

Early life
Beitan was studying with Johannes Goritzki, Victoria Yagling and Natalia Gutman. When Beitan was four, he began his first cello studies in Latvia with Irina Titarenko in Jelgava, Latvia. At the age of five, Beitan had his first solo concert and at the age of six, he was invited to perform at a concert that was broadcast on National Latvian Television (Latvian: Latvijas Televīzija) where was awarded by the Latvian composer Raimods Pauls. Since his early childhood, Beitan performed all over Europe and has won 18 international music competitions, five of which were the highest Grand Prix Awards, including the Grand Prix of the National Competition "Talent of Latvia", ‘’Liezen cello competition’’ Grand Prix (as an additional prize he received 19th century cello from the Soros Foundation as a gift), Teodor Reiter international competition Grand Prix, the Dotzauer Prize in Dresden and the "New Names" in Moscow, which led to him studying with Daniel Shafran. In 2006 he graduated from a Musical College in Latvia and began attending The Royal College of Music in London, where Beitan obtained a Higher Education Degree. He obtained Master's and Soloist Degree at the Conservatorio della Svizzera Italiana in Lugano.

Career 
In 1997 he was awarded at the Tchaikovsky International competition for youth and performed at the Great Hall of the Rimsky-Korsakov conservatory in St.Petersburg. In the 1997 he was personally awarded by the Latvian President Guntis Ulmanis for the international achievements. In the 2007 he was invited to perform on the Latvian Independence Day where he met a new president of Latvia Valdis Zatlers. In 2008 Beitan met and had an open lesson with a Bernard Greenhouse during Maestro's visit in Royal College of Music London. In 2010 he met Ivo Pogorelich which has resulted in many years of collaboration. Max Beitan guests with the orchestras such as The Latvian National Symphony Orchestra, Orchestra della Svizzera Italiana, Sinfonietta Riga, Saint Petersburg State Academic Cappella, The Latvian National Opera Orchestra, The Latvian National Opera Choir, Dresdner Philharmonie, Evian Festival Orchestra, Kaunas City Symphony Orchestra, Lithuanian Chamber Orchestra. Max Beitan has appeared in concert with a conductors such as Rafael Frühbeck, Nicholas Milton, Alexander Vilumanis, Normunds Sne, Aigars Merijs-Meri, Andris Vecumnieks, Vladislav Chernushenko, Rimas Geniusas, Laurence Dale.

Max Beitan was performing on the pre-opening of the LAC Lugano concert hall. He is a participant of the Lugano Festival, Baltic Musical Seasons, Summertime Festival Jurmala, Evian Festival and others. He performed on the Venetian Film Festival Musical awards with Erika Lemay as well as opening Latvian Musical Awards ceremony together with the violinist Raimonds Ozols. Riccardo Muti, Vladimir Ashkenazy, Andris Nelsons, Valery Gergiev, Yuri Temirkanov, Heinrich Schiff, Maria Kliegel and Heinz Holliger have admired his playing.

Activities 
Mr. Beitan is passionate in charity activities and is working with the cultural foundations to bring artist and instrument together by encouraging philanthropists and investors to acquire the finest Italian instruments. To assist and promote young musicians, as well as renowned artists, with their careers by loaning them top-class instruments created by Antonio Stradivari, Guarneri del Gesu and other famous historical Italian violinmaker.

In collaboration with Fondo Ambiente Italiana and Fine Violins Vienna he has organized an exhibition at the Villa del Balbianello on the Como Lake in 2014. In 2016 he presented a quartet of Stradivari instruments in Villa Mozart in Milan. In 2017 in collaboration with the Baltic Musical Seasons and Fine Violins Vienna Beitan brought an Italian stringed instrument collection to The Art Museum Riga Bourse in Latvia.

Recognition and awards

 Grand Prix, National Competition "Talent-Latvia", Riga, Latvia, 1992
 Grand Prix, International Cello competition, Liezen, Austria, 1996
 Award, International P.Tchaikovsky Competition in St.Petersburg, Russia, 1997
 Grand Prix, National Competition "Talent-Latvia", Riga, Latvia, 1998
 1st prize, International Competition "Valsesia Musica" in Italy, 2002
 Grand Prix, T. Reiter International Competition in Riga, Latvia, 2002
 1st Prize, International Competition "Olimpo Muzikale" in Kaunas (Lithuania), 2005
 1st prize MBF Education Awards London, UK 2007
 1st prize, Anna Shuttleworth Prize, London, UK 2008
 Award, Credit Suisse Prix, Luzern, Switzerland 2012
 2nd International Dotzauer Competition in Dresden, Germany, 2001 and 2005
 2nd prize International E.Bloch Competition, London, UK 2009
ESKAS Swiss Government Scholarship, May 2010, 2011

Instruments
Instruments he has played includes:

Antonio Stradivari cello “Archinto” from 1689
Antonio Stradivari cello “Magg” from 1698
David Tecchler cello from 1698

References

External links
Max Beitan General Management
L'Officiel Cover Article

1986 births
Latvian classical cellists
Living people